Please Don't Ever Change is a pub rock album by Brinsley Schwarz, released in 1973, named after the featured Goffin/King song, also recorded by The Crickets and The Beatles.

Track listing
All tracks composed by Nick Lowe; except where indicated
 "Hooked on Love" (Ian Gomm) – 2:31
 "Why Do We Hurt the One We Love"  – 3:47
 "I Worry ('Bout You Baby)"  – 2:59
 "Don't Ever Change" (Gerry Goffin, Carole King)  – 3:48
 "Home in My Hand" (Ronnie Self)  – 5:28
 "Play That Fast Thing (One More Time)"  – 4:24
 "I Won't Make It Without You"  – 4:19
 "Down in Mexico"  – 3:48
 "Speedoo" (Esther Navarro) – 2:41
 "The Version (Hypocrite)" (Leroy Sibbles) – 2:46

Personnel
Brinsley Schwarz
 Brinsley Schwarz	 - 	guitar, Alto saxophone, piano, vocals
 Ian Gomm	 - 	guitar, vocals
 Billy Rankin	 - 	drums
 Bob Andrews	 - 	piano, organ, vocals
 Nick Lowe	 - 	bass guitar, vocals
Technical 
Kingsley Ward, Len Foster, Vic Maile - engineers
Waldo's Design - sleeve

References

Brinsley Schwarz albums
1973 albums
Albums produced by Vic Maile
United Artists Records albums